Robert Lawson (January 23, 1748 – March 28, 1805) was an officer from Virginia in the American Revolutionary War.

In early 1776 Lawson was commissioned a major in the 4th Virginia Regiment of the Continental Army. He eventually became the colonel in command of the regiment. He resigned from the Continental Army in December 1777.

Lawson returned to active duty in 1779 as a brigadier general in the Virginia militia. According to some accounts, he commanded the Virginia militia at the Battle of Guilford Court House.

Biography

Family
Robert Lawson was born 23 Jan 1748 and died 28 Mar 1805 in Richmond, Virginia. His obituary in the Richmond Gazette and General Advertiser states that his funeral was held at the State Capitol that afternoon, and then his body was escorted by the City Guards to the St. John's Episcopal Churchyard for burial. He was the son of Benjamin Lawson and Elizabeth Claiborne. He married Sarah Meriwether Pierce 13 Dec 1769 in VA, daughter of John Pierce and  Sarah.   She was born, and died 10 Jun 1809.

Children:
Sarah Meriwether Lawson b 9/13/1770 d 4/19/1771 
America Lawson b 1/22/1778 d 10/1/1830 
John Pierce Lawson b 2/23/1781 d 6/1/1809 
Arria Lawson b 3/14/1785 d 10/24/1787 
Columbus Lawson b 8/11/1789 Kentucky d 1/8/1815

Continental   Service
Major, 4th Virginia, 13 February 1776  
Lieutenant Colonel, 4th Virginia, 13 August 1776  
Colonel, 4th Virginia, 19 August 1777  
Resigned, 17 December 1777

The 4th Virginia Regiment was authorized by the fourth Virginia convention on December 1, 1775, and accepted by Congress on February 13, 1776. The  4th Virginia Regiment joined Washington's army late in 1776 and participated in the battles of Trenton and Germantown. (Sanchez-Saavedra   p42)  
On November 23, 1776, the 4th, 5th, and 6th Virginia Regiments joined the army at New Brunswick, New Jersey, forming a brigade of 745 men under Adam Stephen (Sellers 1978:6-7,9,11. Lesser 176:40)

Battles  of  the  4th   Virginia   Regiment:  
Battle of Trenton, 26 December 1776 
Second Battle of Trenton, January 1777  
Battle of Princeton, January 1777  
Battle of Brandywine, 11 September 1777  
Battle of Germantown, 4 October 1777

Virginia   Militia
Colonel, Steven's Brigade, Battle of Camden, 16 August 1780 ???
General, Lawson's Brigade, Guilford Courthouse, 15 March 1781  
General, Attached with General Steuben, Point of Fork, June 5, 1881  
General, Lawson's Brigade, Siege of Yorktown, September - October 1781

Public   Service
Attended Virginia Convention, St John's Church Richmond, March 1775  
Attended Virginia Convention, July 1775  
Attended Virginia Convention, December 1775 
Member Virginia House of Delegates, May 4 - December 19, 1778 
Member Virginia House of Delegates, May 1, 1780 - March 22, 1781  
Member Virginia House of Delegates, May - December 28, 1782   
Member Virginia House of Delegates, May 5 - December 22, 1783  
Member Virginia House of Delegates, October 15, 1787 - January 8, 1788  
Deputy Attorney General Prince Edward County 1784 to April 1788.

Delegate, Convention of the Commonwealth of Virginia on the adoption of the Federal Constitution, June 1788  
Voted in the minority against ratification of the Federal Constitution, 25 June 1788.

Trustee, Hampden-Sydney College, 1783-1805

In popular culture 
· Turn: Washington's Spies: Briefly portrayed by Virginia Governor Terry McAuliffe in Season 3; Episode 7 "Judgement".

References

Purcell, L. Edward. Who Was Who in the American Revolution." New York: Facts on File, 1993. .
Wagner v. Baird, 48 U.S. 234 (1849)
"The Southern Campaign" in The Magazine of American History with Notes and Queries by John Austin Stevens, Benjamin Franklin DeCosta, Martha Joanna Lamb, Henry Phelps Johnston, Nathan Gilbert Pond, William Abbatt, 1881, p 36-46.Richmond Gazette and General Advertiser, Vol. XIX, Issue 1301, Page 3, Saturday, March 30, 1805. Source: GenealogyBank.com''

1805 deaths
1748 births
Continental Army officers from Virginia
Militia generals in the American Revolution
Virginia militiamen in the American Revolution